Golubtsov is a Russian masculine surname, its feminine counterpart is Golubtsova. It may refer to:

Igor Golubtsov (born 1955), Russian football functionary and coach
Vadim Golubtsov (born 1988), Russian ice hockey player
Vyacheslav Golubtsov (1894–1972), Soviet and Russian scientist

Russian-language surnames